Bloomfield is the name of a neighborhood on the West Shore of the New York City borough of Staten Island. It lies immediately to the north of Travis-Chelsea and to the west of Bulls Head. Prall's Island is situated in the Arthur Kill off its coast.

Originally named Daniell's Neck when first settled in the 17th century, it was later called Merrell Town after a local farmer.  Its present name first appeared on a local map in 1874.

History

20th century 

Throughout the 20th century, very few people actually resided in Bloomfield, much of its land being used by construction companies to store heavy equipment, such as cement mixers.  A large oil storage terminal maintained by Gulf Oil could also once be found there, leading to one of the service roads of the West Shore Expressway receiving the name of Gulf Avenue; the  terminal (built in 1936), which housed 82 tanks having a total capacity of 215 million US gallons, was closed in 1998, and the tanks have since been demolished. Commercial, but not residential, development accelerated rapidly in the late 1980s, when several large office buildings were constructed

Gas explosion 

On February 10, 1973, during a cleaning operation, 42 workers were inside one of the TETCo natural gas tanks which had supposedly been completely drained ten months earlier. However, ignition occurred, causing a plume of combusting gas to rise within the tank. Two workers near the top felt the heat and rushed to the safety of scaffolding outside, while the other 40 workers died as the concrete cap on the tank rose 20–30 feet in the air and then came crashing back down, crushing them to death.

21st century 
In the early 2000s, other businesses, including two hotels, Hilton Garden Inn in 2001 and Hampton Inn & Suites opened in 2007 on South Avenue, the main thoroughfare. Bloomfield's vast expanses of open space have made it the focus of many ambitious proposals in the 2000s, including a failed proposal to build a NASCAR racetrack at the site of the former Gulf Oil facility. In Fall of 2018 the Matrix Global Logistics Park opened in Bloomfield, a distribution center for companies such as Amazon and Ikea, bringing more than 2,000 jobs and development to the area. But the area has yet to witness the kind of new-home construction that has been encountered virtually everywhere else on Staten Island since the Verrazzano-Narrows Bridge opened in 1964.

Transportation
Bloomfield is served by the  local-limited bus pair along South Avenue, and the  local-limited bus pair to the Matrix Global Logistics Park on Gulf Avenue. A proposal for the West Shore Light Rail has it running down the Travis Branch of the North Shore Railroad, stopping at a station in Bloomfield.

References

Neighborhoods in Staten Island